The Blindness of Fortune is a 1917 British silent drama film directed by Frank Wilson and starring Chrissie White, Lionelle Howard, and Violet Hopson.

Cast
 Chrissie White as Rose Jordan  
 Lionelle Howard as Sir Hector Gray  
 Violet Hopson as Grace Hardfeldt  
 William Felton as Basil Hardfeldt  
 John MacAndrews as Joe Greenwell  
 Henry Vibart as Dr. Lindley

References

Bibliography
 Palmer, Scott. British Film Actors' Credits, 1895-1987. McFarland, 1988.

External links

1917 films
1917 drama films
British drama films
British silent feature films
Films directed by Frank Wilson
Films set in England
Hepworth Pictures films
British black-and-white films
1910s English-language films
1910s British films
Silent drama films